RBC scholarships offered to students by Royal Bank of Canada

Scholarships
 RBC Royal Bank Scholarship for Undergraduates 
 Students entering 2nd to final year of an undergraduate university or college program. 9 awards worth $5,000, $3,000 or $2,000 each

 RBC Royal Bank Scholarship for First-Year Medical & Dental Students
 Students entering first year of a Canadian medical or dental school in the 2009/2010 academic year. 27 awards worth $5,000 each

 RBC Junior 'A' Scholarship Awards 
 Hockey Players on a Canadian Junior 'A' Team. 10 awards worth $1,000 each, plus 1 award worth $5,000
  
 RBC Royal Bank Financial Lifeskills Scholarships  
 Graduating high school or CEGEP students. 10 awards of $2,009

 RBC Royal Bank Scholarship
 for New Canadians Graduating high school or CEGEP students born outside Canada. 12 awards worth $3,500 each

 RBC Aboriginal Student Awards Program 
 Status and non-status Indians, Inuit or Métis pursuing post-secondary education. 10 awards of $4,000

RBC Financial Group Junior ‘A’ Scholarships, starting in 2002, are awarded to one player from each of the Canadian Junior Hockey League Junior ‘A’ Hockey Leagues. One of those is chosen as the national winner and is awarded a national scholarship. 
Scholarships are awarded on the basis of academic achievement, hockey achievement and community involvement. 
Players eligible for the RBC Financial Group Junior ‘A’ Scholarships must be a Canadian citizen, on a Canadian Junior ‘A’ team roster and registered or applying for full-time post-secondary studies.

RBC Financial Group MJHL Scholarship

as of the 2007-08 season.

References
 RBC Scholarships
 http://www.rbcroyalbank.com/RBC:SncqHY71A8UAJbAW3kw/scholarships/ 
Hockey Canada

Manitoba Junior Hockey League trophies and awards
Scholarships in Canada